The enzyme 4-oxalmesaconate hydratase catalyzes the chemical reaction

2-hydroxy-4-oxobutane-1,2,4-tricarboxylate  (1E,3E)-4-hydroxybuta-1,3-diene-1,2,4-tricarboxylate + H2O

This enzyme belongs to the family of lyases, specifically the hydro-lyases, which cleave carbon-oxygen bonds.  The systematic name of this enzyme class is (1E,3E)-4-hydroxybuta-1,3-diene-1,2,4-tricarboxylate 1,2-hydro-lyase (2-hydroxy-4-oxobutane-1,2,4-tricarboxylate-forming). Other names in common use include 4-carboxy-2-oxohexenedioate hydratase, 4-carboxy-2-oxobutane-1,2,4-tricarboxylate 2,3-hydro-lyase, oxalmesaconate hydratase, γ-oxalmesaconate hydratase, 4-carboxy-2-oxohexenedioate hydratase, and 2-hydroxy-4-oxobutane-1,2,4-tricarboxylate 2,3-hydro-lyase.  This enzyme participates in benzoate degradation via hydroxylation.

References 

 

EC 4.2.1
Enzymes of unknown structure